Frank Ciaccia (born 11 September 1959) is a Canadian former soccer player who earned three caps for the national team in 1981. Born in Vancouver, he played college soccer for Simon Fraser University, before beginning a professional career with the Toronto Blizzard of the North American Soccer League. In 1983, he played with the Toronto Nationals of the Canadian Professional Soccer League. He joined the New Westminster Police Service in 1984, and as of May 2010 is the Inspector On Assignment.

References

External links
 
 

1959 births
Canada men's international soccer players
Canadian soccer players
Canadian people of Italian descent
Simon Fraser Clan men's soccer players
Living people
Soccer players from Vancouver
Toronto Blizzard (1971–1984) players
North American Soccer League (1968–1984) indoor players
Canadian police officers
Association football midfielders
Toronto Nationals (soccer) players
Canadian Professional Soccer League (original) players